Fenno's paradox is the belief that people generally disapprove of the United States Congress as a whole, but support the congressmen from their own congressional districts.  It is named after political scientist Richard Fenno, who discussed this in his 1978 book Home Style: House Members in Their Districts. Fenno discovered that congressmen would often run against Congress.

"Fenno's paradox" has also been applied to areas other than politics including public schools.  For example, U.S. citizens largely disapprove of the public school system, but tend to like the particular local schools their children attend.

See also 
 NIMBY

Notes

Political science terminology
Politics of Florida
Decision-making paradoxes